Chrysocercops azmii is a moth of the family Gracillariidae. It is known from Selangor, Malaysia.

The wingspan is 5.9–7.6 mm.

The larvae feed on Shorea maxima. They mine the leaves of their host plant.

Etymology
This species is named in honour of Mr. Azmi Mahyudin of the Forest Research Institute of Malaysia, Kuala Lumpur, Malaysia.

References

Chrysocercops
Moths described in 1992